Cheongju Baseball Stadium is a baseball park in Cheongju, South Korea. The stadium serves as a secondary home of the Hanwha Eagles.

1979 establishments in South Korea
Baseball venues in South Korea
Doosan Bears
Hanwha Eagles
Cheongju
Sports venues completed in 1979
20th-century architecture in South Korea